Julian Talbot (born 1961) is an Australian writer, speaker and consultant on risk management. He is co-author of the book Security Risk Management Body of Knowledge.

Education

Talbot graduated with a Master in Risk Management degree from Monash University, Melbourne, Australia, in 2006. He is a Certified Protection Professional, the security industry's highest level of professional achievement.

Career

In the period 1995-2001, Talbot served as head of security for Woodside Energy's North West Shelf Venture, Australia's largest natural resources project. He then worked as head of risk and security for the Malaysia Smelting Corporation's Indonesian operations, as senior risk adviser for the Australian Department of Health and Ageing, and as head of security for the Australian Trade Commission (Austrade). From 2006 to 2009, he was the risk management practice leader for Jakeman Business Solutions (JBS), one of Australia's leading consulting firms.

From 2007 to 2015, he served as the chairman of Citadel Group Limited  and also was a member of its Audit Review Committee.

Public service

Talbot served as director of the Risk Management Institution of Australasia (2006–09) and as director of the Australian Institute of Professional Intelligence Officers (2008–09).

He was the director of the Security Analysis and Risk Management Association, based in Washington, DC from 2010 to 2015.

Writing career

In 2009 Talbot co-authored the Security Risk Management Body of Knowledge, a large and comprehensive repository of knowledge, including the best practices, recent innovations and evolving research, in the area of security risk management.

Public speaking 
He is a professional speaker at international conferences.

References

External links 
 

Australian writers
Australian consultants
Living people
1961 births